Einarson is a surname. Notable people with the surname include:

Henry Einarson (1918–1992), Canadian politician
John Einarson (born 1952), Canadian rock journalist 
Kerri Einarson (born 1987), Canadian curler
Oddvar Einarson (born 1949), Norwegian movie director

See also
Einarsson